The 2011 Wichita Wild season was the team's fifth season as a professional indoor football franchise and third in the Indoor Football League (IFL). One of twenty-two teams competing in the IFL for the 2011 season, the Park City, Kansas-based Wichita Wild were members of the Great Plains Division of the Intense Conference.

Under the leadership of interim head coach Morris Lolar, who took over for Ken Matous after an 0–5 start, the team played their home games at the Hartman Arena in Park City, Kansas.

Schedule
Key:

Regular season
All start times are local time

Roster

Standings

References

2011 Indoor Football League season
2011 in sports in Kansas
American football in Kansas